Narakorn Khana (born April 7, 1993) is a professional footballer from Thailand. He currently plays for Ubon United.

References

External links

1993 births
Living people
Narakorn Khana
Association football midfielders
Narakorn Khana
Narakorn Khana
Narakorn Khana
Narakorn Khana